The Fribourg trolleybus system forms part of the public transport network in Fribourg, capital of the canton of Fribourg, Switzerland. The system also serves the neighbouring municipalities of Villars-sur-Glâne and Givisiez, using one line in each case.

History

The current system is the second of two trolleybus systems to operate in Fribourg. The first opened on 4 January 1912 and connected the town with Farvagny. It closed on 21 May 1932. It was the first trolleybus system in Switzerland and was the country's only such service for its entire 20-year existence. The Lausanne trolleybus system opened a few months after closure of the Fribourg–Farvagny line.

The second Fribourg trolleybus system opened on 31 January 1949 and gradually replaced the Fribourg tramway network, the last line of which closed on 31 March 1965.

The individual line sections of the Fribourg trolleybus system went into operation as follows:

Lines 
The present system is made up of the following cross-city routes, including dual-mode line 1:

Fleet

Retired fleet 
In the past, at one time or another the trolleybus fleet has included two-axle vehicles made by several different manufacturers, including Vétra-Renault, Vétra-Berliet, Saurer, Henschel and Volvo.  All of these were purchased new except for the four Henschels (nos. 43–46), which came secondhand from the Giessen, Germany, trolleybus system (in whose fleet they had been nos. 19–22).  The first articulated vehicles were purchased in 1988–89.  Numbered 101–112, they were Hess-bodied Volvos with ABB electrical equipment, and they were also dual-mode. They used their diesel engines to operate unwired extensions – sections not equipped with overhead wires – of trolleybus route 2, beyond Moncor to Les Biches and Les Dailles.  In 2005, the route section to Les Dailles was fitted with trolleybus wiring, allowing trolleybuses to serve route 2 entirely in electric mode, except for certain weekday trips to Les Biches, which section remained unwired.

Current fleet 
A total of 21 vehicles is available to operate trolleybus services in Fribourg, all of them low-floor articulated buses:

See also

List of trolleybus systems in Switzerland

References

Notes

Books

External links

 
 

Transport in Fribourg
Fribourg
Fribourg
1912 establishments in Switzerland
1949 establishments in Switzerland